Charaxes numenes, the lesser blue charaxes, is a butterfly in the family Nymphalidae. It is found in Senegal, Guinea-Bissau, Guinea, Sierra Leone, Liberia, Ivory Coast, Ghana, Benin, Nigeria, Equatorial Guinea, Cameroon, Gabon, the Republic of the Congo, Angola, the Democratic Republic of the Congo, Zambia, the Central African Republic, Sudan, Ethiopia, Uganda, Kenya and Tanzania.

Description
Ch. numenes Hew. (31 c). Tails of the hindwing short. Hindwing beneath somewhat beyond the middle with a continuous, fine, gently curved, black transverse line, distally bordered with white, almost exactly as in violetta. In this these two species differ from all the rest of the tiridates group. Male, wings above bluish black, at the base black-brown; forewing in the middle with four small blue spots in the basal part of cellules 2-5 and usually also behind the middle with a transverse row of blue dots; marginal spots distinct, ochre-yellow. Hindwing beyond the middle with a row of blue dots, incurved in cellule 6; small whitish submarginal spots and fine whitish marginal streaks. The female agrees almost entirely with that of tiridates Sierra Leone to Angola and Uganda. - neumanni Rothsch. has larger yellow marginal spots on both wings and somewhat 
longer tail-appendages on the hindwing; Abyssinia.

Biology
The habitat consists of evergreen lowland forests.

The larvae feed on Hugonia platysepela, Grewia mollis, Grewia forbesi, Grewia trichocarpa, Deinbollia fulvotomentella, Erythrina abyssinica, Erythrina excelsa, Allophylus, Blighia unijugata and Phialodiscus unijugatus.

Subspecies
Charaxes numenes numenes (Senegal, Guinea-Bissau, Guinea, Sierra Leone, Liberia, Ivory Coast, Ghana, Benin, western Nigeria)
Charaxes numenes aequatorialis van Someren, 1972 (Nigeria, Cameroon, Gabon, Congo, northern Angola, Democratic Republic of the Congo, Zambia, Central African Republic, southern Sudan, Uganda, western Kenya, western Tanzania)
Charaxes numenes malabo Turlin, 1998 (Bioko)
Charaxes numenes neumanni Rothschild, 1902  (southern and western Ethiopia)

Taxonomy
Charaxes tiridates group.

The supposed clade members are:

Charaxes tiridates
Charaxes numenes - similar to next
Charaxes bipunctatus - similar to last
Charaxes violetta
Charaxes fuscus
Charaxes mixtus
Charaxes bubastis
Charaxes albimaculatus
Charaxes barnsi
Charaxes bohemani
Charaxes schoutedeni
Charaxes monteiri
Charaxes smaragdalis
Charaxes xiphares
Charaxes cithaeron
Charaxes nandina
Charaxes imperialis
Charaxes ameliae
Charaxes pythodoris
? Charaxes overlaeti
For a full list see Eric Vingerhoedt, 2013.

References

Seitz, A. Die Gross-Schmetterlinge der Erde 13: Die Afrikanischen Tagfalter. Plate XIII 31
Victor Gurney Logan Van Someren, 1972 Revisional notes on African Charaxes (Lepidoptera: Nymphalidae). Part VIII. Bulletin of the British Museum (Natural History) (Entomology)215-264. also as Charaxes albimaculatus

External links
Images of C. n. aequatorialis Royal Museum for Central Africa (Albertine Rift Project)
Images of C. n. numenes (Albertine Rift Project)
C. n. neumanni images at Consortium for the Barcode of Life
C. n. aequatorialis at BOLD

Butterflies described in 1859
numenes